Nicolas Morês da Cruz (born 18 May 1997) commonly known as Nicolas Careca, is a Brazilian footballer who plays for Guarani, on loan from CRB, as a forward.

Career statistics

References

External links
 

1997 births
Living people
Brazilian footballers
Brazilian expatriate footballers
Association football forwards
Campeonato Brasileiro Série A players
Campeonato Brasileiro Série B players
Ukrainian Premier League players
Liga Portugal 2 players
Grêmio Foot-Ball Porto Alegrense players
Figueirense FC players
Oeste Futebol Clube players
FC Vorskla Poltava players
G.D. Estoril Praia players
Clube de Regatas Brasil players
Guarani FC players
Brazilian expatriate sportspeople in Ukraine
Brazilian expatriate sportspeople in Portugal
Expatriate footballers in Ukraine
Expatriate footballers in Portugal
Footballers from Brasília